7th Sea is a "swashbuckling and sorcery"-themed tabletop role-playing game by John Wick. It is set in the fictional world of Théah, a fantasy version of 17th century Earth. Originally published by AEG, 7th Sea is currently published by Chaosium.

Setting 

The 7th Sea RPG is set in a world that draws direct influence from the literature of 17th century Europe. Each country in the world can be compared to a European kingdom but is an exaggerated representation. Sorcery is a large part of the world with many types available to players. The dominant religion in the world, the belief in Theus and his prophets, is based on a form of Gnostic Christianity and features a parallel of the Spanish Inquisition. There are also references to the Knights Templars, Masons and the Invisible College of scientists.

All major European powers have their representations in Théah. Avalon (England), Castille (Spain), Montaigne (France), Eisen (Germany), Ussura (Russia), Vendel (Netherlands) Vestenmanavnjar (Scandinavia) and Vodacce (Italy) are the main cultures of the game. There is also Inismore (Ireland), Highland Marches (Scotland), the Crescent Empire (Ottoman / Arab), Midnight Archipelago (Caribbean and North Africa) and the secretive Cathay (China / Korea / Tibet).  The second edition introduced another nation, the Sarmatian Commonwealth (Polish–Lithuanian Commonwealth).

History 
Alderac Entertainment Group published the Game Master's Guide and Player's Guide for Seventh Sea in April 1999 in a lay-flat binding. Originally 7th Sea materials were published using a d10 (roll-and-keep) dice system. The game was fairly well received. Some of the game's later supplements included information about the game's world that affected its flavor, including an extensive and rather Lovecraftian background to sorcery.

In 2001, Studio G published two comic books: 7th Sea – Absolution and 7th Sea: Prelude to Ruin.

In 2004, Alderac switched to the d20 System and re-branded the game to Swashbuckling Adventures. After poor sales of the three Swashbuckling Adventure d20 books, a series of hybrid books were published which supported both the d20 system and the d10 system. Alderac no longer publishes books for the system although a series of electronic books has been released by volunteer writers through the AEG website.

In 2015, Alderac Entertainment Group announced that they had entered into a deal with John Wick Presents, effectively transferring the publication rights for 7th Sea to John Wick. AEG will still retain limited rights to publish undisclosed products. Wick successfully crowd-funded the campaign of the second edition of the game on Kickstarter on March 13, 2016, with the first book – the new core rules – coming out in June of that year. Later that month, the 7th Sea Explorers' Society was launched on DriveThruRPG to allow fans to self-publish material for the setting.

On November 12, 2017, a separate effort raised money for 7th Sea: Khitai, the East Asian-inspired counterpart to 7th Sea. The rate of publication proved to be unsustainable, though, and in November of the following year Wick was forced to lay off his staff and defer further publication for the line.

On April 2, 2019, Chaosium announced that they had acquired the rights to the 7th Sea product line along with the Second Edition and Khitai Kickstarters from John Wick, including back stock of books published so far. Work on the product line has since resumed.

Reception
In 2000, 7th Sea won the Origins Award for Best Roleplaying Game of 1999. The setting also inspired a collectible card game. The card game was discontinued in 2005, and the role-playing game subsequently went out of print.

Reviews
SF Site

See also 
 7th Sea (collectible card game)

References

External links
 

Fantasy role-playing games
D20 System
Alderac Entertainment Group games
Origins Award winners
Multigenre Swashbuckler role-playing games
Role-playing games introduced in 1999
Role-playing game systems